The California state elections, June 2012 were held on June 5, 2012 and included two propositions, primary elections for each party's nominee for President, and primary elections to determine the top-two candidates for California's Class I seat to the United States Senate, all of California's seats to the House of Representatives, all of the seats of the State Assembly, and all odd-numbered seats of the State Senate, who will compete against each other in a run-off on November 6, 2012.

This was the first election with California's newly implemented nonpartisan blanket primary in effect, pursuant to Proposition 14, which passed with 53% voter approval in June 2010. Additionally, in November 2010, voters approved Proposition 20, which authorized a California Citizens Redistricting Commission to re-draw congressional district lines, in addition to its current job of drawing state senate district lines and state assembly district lines, taking away that job from the California state legislature. This was the first election which used the Citizens Redistricting Commission's maps.


Primary elections

President of the United States
Incumbent President Barack Obama ran unopposed on the Democratic primary ballot. Governor Mitt Romney and Rep. Ron Paul competed in the Republican primary.

Republican primary

United States Senate

United States House of Representatives

State Senate

State Assembly

Propositions
100% ( 21,993 of 21,993 ) precincts partially or fully reporting as of June 22, 2012, 4:49 p.m

Proposition 28

Proposition 28 is an initiative constitutional amendment that would change California state legislature term limits from a limit of 8 years for the Senate and 6 years for the Assembly, to a limit of 12 years on combined service.

Proposition 29

Proposition 29 is an initiative statute that would add a $1 tax on cigarettes to fund cancer research.

References

External links 
California Elections and Voter Information

 June
California 06